Betta hendra is a species of gourami. It is native to Asia, where it occurs in the Sabangau River basin in Central Kalimantan on the island of Borneo in Indonesia. It is typically found among plants in peat swamp forests shaded by trees and bushes with a depth of 5 to 50 cm (2 to 19.7 inches) and no water current. Based on aquarium observations, the species forms bubble nests. The species reaches 4.2 cm (1.7 inches) in standard length and is known to be a facultative air-breather.

References 

hendra
Fish of Indonesia
Fish described in 2013